The Free Church is a building located in Hampstead Garden Suburb, Barnet, London. It was built to a design by Sir Edwin Lutyens starting in 1911, and, like St Jude's Church at the opposite side of Central Square, is a Grade I listed building.

History
Initially, Christians in Hampstead Garden Suburb congregated but it was decided in 1909 to organise the Church of England and Free Church meetings separately. The Free Church first met, before the existence of the building, in 1909 and was officially founded in 1910.

Construction of the Free Church was begun on 16 January 1911 and it opened for worship on 25 October that year, though its west end was not completed until the 1960s. It was designed by Sir Edwin Lutyens, who was the consultant architect for the Central Square of Hampstead Garden Suburb from 1906 and had influence on the design of the whole square, including both churches.

Architecture

The church has a low concrete dome, by contrast to the spire of St Jude's. The interior features Tuscan columns with brick plinths, and a barrel vault. The interior is in pastel colours.

References

Further reading
 
 

Churches in the London Borough of Barnet
Grade I listed churches in London
Works of Edwin Lutyens in England
Grade I listed buildings in the London Borough of Barnet
Churches completed in 1911
Buildings and structures in Hampstead Garden Suburb
Church buildings with domes